Vire Normandie is a commune in the Calvados department and Normandy region of north-western France.

It was established on 1 January 2016 as a result of the merger of the former communes of Vire (seat of the new municipality), Coulonces, Maisoncelles-la-Jourdan, Roullours, Saint-Germain-de-Tallevende-la-Lande-Vaumont, Truttemer-le-Grand, Truttemer-le-Petit and Vaudry.

Vire Normandie is the administrative centre (chef-lieu) of the arrondissement of Vire. Vire station has rail connections to Argentan, Paris and Granville.

Population

Twin towns – sister cities

Vire Normandie is twinned with:
 Baunatal, Germany
 Săcele, Romania
 Santa Fe, Spain
 Totnes, England, United Kingdom

See also
Communes of the Calvados department

References 

2016 establishments in France
Communes of Calvados (department)
Populated places established in 2016
Subprefectures in France